The Weedhopper is an American high-wing, tractor configuration, tricycle gear, two-axis control ultralight aircraft originally developed by John Chotia during the height of the 1970s ultralight boom and introduced in 1977. When it was in production the aircraft was sold as a kit for amateur construction and could be assembled in 25-30 man-hours.

By early 2013 the company website had been blanked and put up for sale and it is likely that the company has closed and production ended.

Design and development
Many of the early ultralights used a "weight shift" method of control, requiring the pilot to push a control bar to shift the center of gravity of the aircraft. The Weedhopper differed from most other ultralights of the period in that it has a control stick which moves the rudder and elevator, giving it two axis control in pitch and yaw. The pronounced dihedral of the wings, along with the swept leading edge causes it to bank into the turn, and results in a very stable, easy-to-fly aircraft. The Weedhopper differs from many of the other early ultralights in that it had a strut-braced wing, whereas most period ultralights have wire-braced wings.

The Weedhopper is constructed from aluminium tubing and covered with Dacron pre-sewn envelopes. The early versions of the aircraft developed a poor reputation due to the lack of reliable engines available in the 1970s. This was rectified with the adoption of the Rotax 277  and later the Rotax 447  powerplant.

Over 13,000 Weedhoppers have been sold. It was popular because it offered people an inexpensive way to fly for pleasure. The aircraft could be easily disassembled and put on a trailer for home storage. It was not necessary to rent an expensive hangar. The kits originally sold for $2,000, and in 2011 the  Weedhopper model 40 sold for US$8,495.

In its home country versions of the aircraft are eligible for the FAR 103 Ultralight Vehicles category, the experimental amateur-built category and the light-sport aircraft category.

Variants
Weedhopper A
Initial production version, also known as the JC-24A.
Weedhopper B
Improved production version, also known as the JC-24B.
Weedhopper C
Improved production version, also known as the JC-24C.
Weedhopper Standard
Weedhopper Deluxe
Improved production model with a  Rotax 447 engine.
Weedhopper 40
Current production model with a  Rotax 447 engine.
Weedhopper Super
Weedhopper II
Current production two seat side-by-side seating model with a  Rotax 503 engine. Also known as the Weedhopper Two Place.

Aircraft on display

National Air and Space Museum

Specifications (Weedhopper Model 40)

Comparable aircraft
AmEagle American Eaglet
Avid Champion
Beaujon Enduro
Beaujon Mach .07
Birdman TL-1
Pterodactyl Ascender
Mitchell U-2 Superwing
Ultraflight Lazair
Eipper Quicksilver

References

External links

Official website archives

1970s United States ultralight aircraft
Light-sport aircraft
Single-engined tractor aircraft
High-wing aircraft